Eccellenza is the highest tier of the national women's rugby union competition in Italy.

Teams
Teams competing in the Serie A 2021-2022

Broadcast 
Eleven Sports will be home to the Serie A Championship from 2022–2023.

References 

 

Italy
Rugby union leagues in Italy
Women's sports leagues in Italy
Women's rugby union competitions in Italy